Qol Hasan (also Romanized as Qol Ḩasan; also known as Kolosan, Kūlūsān, and Qal‘eh Ḩasan) is a village in Mokriyan-e Shomali Rural District, in the Central District of Miandoab County, West Azerbaijan Province, Iran. At the 2006 census, its population was 657, in 150 families.

References 

Populated places in Miandoab County